Manish Parashar is a Presidential Professor in the School of Computing, Director of the Scientific Computing and Imaging (SCI) Institute and Chair in Computational Science and Engineering at the University of Utah. He also currently serves as Office Director in the US National Science Foundation’s Office of Advanced Cyberinfrastructure. Parashar is the editor-in-chief of IEEE Transactions on Parallel and Distributed Systems, and Founding Chair of the IEEE Technical Community on High Performance Computing.  He is an AAAS Fellow, ACM Fellow, and IEEE Fellow.

As a leader in cyberinfrastructure research and policy, he has advocated for a national strategic computing reserve and the democratization of cyberinfrastructure’s use and impact. He also focuses on the importance of translational computer science, which bridges foundational, use-inspired, and applied research with the delivery and deployment of its outcomes to a target community.

Early life 
Parashar received a BE degree in Electronics and Telecommunications from Bombay University, India, and MS and PhD degrees in Computer Engineering from Syracuse University. Prior to joining the University of Utah, he was a faculty member at Rutgers University.

Career 
Parashar’s work enables advanced application formulations, such as those based on dynamically adaptive, coupled methods, and data-driven workflows, to be implemented on extreme-scale high-performance computing systems. His contributions have included innovations in data structures and algorithms, programming abstractions, and runtime systems. He has pioneered the use of autonomic computing techniques to address application/system complexity and uncertainty. He has also deployed open-source software encapsulating these research innovations, which directly impact a range of applications.

A leader in structured adaptive mesh refinement, Parashar is one of the earliest researchers to address scalable SAMR. His research has included a theoretical framework for locality preserving distributed and dynamic data-structures for SAMR, programming abstractions that enable distributed, dynamically adaptive formulations to be directly expressed, and a family of innovative partitioning algorithms that incorporate system/applications characteristics, and mechanisms for actively managing SAMR grid-hierarchies. These contributions continue to enable truly scalable SAMR applications and have led to realistic simulations of complex phenomena, such as colliding black-holes and neutron stars, forest fire propagation, and fluid flows in the human heart.

As Assistant Director for Strategic Computing in the US Office of Science and Technology Policy, Parashar led the development of a national strategy for the Future Advanced Computing Ecosystem and the formulation of the National Strategic Computing Reserve in response to the COVID-19 pandemic.

Since becoming Office Director at the National Science Foundation’s Office of Advanced Cyberinfrastructure, Parashar has led the development of NSF’s strategic vision for a National Cyberinfrastructure Ecosystem for 21st century science and engineering. A key element of this vision is ensuring equitable access and democratizing cyberinfrastructure’s use and impact. He also co-chairs the National Science and Technology Council’s Subcommittee on the Future Advanced Computing Ecosystem.

Awards and recognitions 

 AAAS Fellow
 ACM Fellow
 IEEE Fellow
 IEEE Golden Core award
 IEEE T&C Distinguished Leadership Award
 R&D 100 Award

References

University of Mumbai alumni
Rutgers University faculty
Living people
University of Utah faculty
Syracuse University alumni
Year of birth missing (living people)